David Platt (born 1966) is an English former footballer

David Platt may refer to:

David Platt (Coronation Street, fictional character in the British soap opera Coronation Street
David Platt (darts player) (born 1966), Australian darts player
David Platt (director), American film and television director
David Platt (pastor) (born 1978), American pastor